The International Short Film Festival Cine a la Calle (Spanish: Festival Internacional de Cortometrajes Cine a la Calle or FICICA) is a film festival dedicated to short films. Organized by the Foundation Cine a la Calle in Barranquilla, Colombia, it takes place every year by early May, featuring around 200 short films from more than 30 countries. It is considered to be the pioneer of its kind in Colombia and one of the most influential in Latin America. It boasts around 15000 attendees annually, since 2001.

References

External links

Film festivals in Colombia
2001 establishments in Colombia
Short film festivals
May events